Solanum cinereum is a species of plant in the family Solanaceae, known by the common name Narrawa burr. It is native to open woodland in south eastern Australia.

Solanum cinereum is a small perennial shrub, either sprawling, or erect to one metre. The leaves are heavily lobed, dark green, and shiny, and have sharp ~1 cm spines over their surface, and along the major veins. The flowers are mauve–purple, and occur all year, but less often in winter. The fruit is like a small, hard tomato, up to about 2 cm in diameter, coloured yellow green, drying to black.

Solanum cinereum is considered a weed in farmland, because it is poisonous to sheep, cattle, and possibly horses.

References

cinerea